Acleris macropterana is a species of moth of the family Tortricidae. It is found in China (Shanxi).

The wingspan is about 26 mm. The forewings are ferruginous white with scattered black spots. The hindwings are white. Adults have been recorded on wing in May.

References

Moths described in 1993
macropterana
Moths of Asia